C/2017 U7 (PanSTARRS) is a hyperbolic comet (previously classified as A/2017 U7, a hyperbolic asteroid), first observed on 29 October 2017 by astronomers of the Pan-STARRS facility at Haleakala Observatory, Hawaii, United States when the object was  from the Sun. Despite being discovered only 10 days after interstellar asteroid 1I/'Oumuamua, it was not announced until March 2018 (along with C/2018 C2 (Lemmon), which was believed to be another hyperbolic asteroid at the time) as its orbit is not strongly hyperbolic beyond most Oort Cloud comets. Based on the absolute magnitude of 10.6, it may measure tens of kilometers in diameter. As of August 2018, there is only 1 hyperbolic asteroid known, ʻOumuamua, but hundreds of hyperbolic comets are known.

Orbit 

Although C/2017 U7's orbit is no longer bound to the Solar System, unlike ʻOumuamua, it is probably not an interstellar object. It had an inbound orbital period of roughly 800000 years. Its point of origin is inclined only 3.5 degrees from the galactic plane, but its aphelion points roughly to the Galactic anticenter, so if it did somehow originate from interstellar space with a typical Solar System velocity (which is highly unlikely) it would have been travelling on an unusual orbit directly into the galactic core from beyond the Sun's orbit around the Milky Way.

A barycentric orbit of C/2017 U7, however, shows that it is only a very distant Solar System object, approaching as far as 16,000 ± 1,000 AU from the Sun, around the distance of the Oort Cloud. It had an inbound orbital period of roughly 740,000 years until the current approach to the Solar System, where perturbations show it on an extremely weak hyperbolic trajectory after leaving the planetary region of the Solar System. The barycentric eccentricity increases above 1 starting with an epoch of July 2022, reaching 1.0000088 once it gets beyond planetary perturbations.

, C/2017 U7 is inbound  from the Sun. C/2017 U7 makes closest approach to the Sun on 10 September 2019 at a distance of 6.4 AU (outside of Jupiter's orbit).
The dynamical analysis shows that the object has probably originated in the Oort cloud, however an interstellar origin cannot be discarded.

Physical characterization 
The spectra and the colors of the hyperbolic comet C/2017 U7 (PANSTARRS) are atypical and the feature and overall spectral shape can be reproduced by laboratory spectra of kerite, a template for aliphatic-rich hydrocarbons that has been previously identified in NIR cometary spectra absorptions.

Notes

References

External links 
 

Cometary object articles
Hyperbolic comets
Discoveries by Pan-STARRS
20171029